Sylvester or Silvester is a name derived from the Latin adjective silvestris meaning "wooded" or "wild", which derives from the noun silva meaning "woodland". Classical Latin spells this with i. In Classical Latin, y represented a separate sound distinct from i, not a native Latin sound but one used in transcriptions of foreign words. After the Classical period y was pronounced as i. Spellings with Sylv- in place of Silv- date from after the Classical period.

Given name
Sylvester of Marsico (c. 1100–1162), Count of Marsico in the Kingdom of Sicily
Silvester Ashioya (born 1948), Kenyan hockey player
Silvester Bolam (1905–1953), British newspaper editor
Silvester Brito (1937–2018), American poet and academic
Sylvester Croom (born 1954), American football coach and former player
Silvester Diggles (1817–1880), Australian musician and ornithologist
Silvester Fernandes (born 1936), Kenyan hockey player
Silvester Gardiner (1708–1786), American physician etc.
Silvester Goraseb (born 1974), Namibian footballer
Sylvester Graham (1794–1851), Presbyterian minister, father of graham crackers
Silvester Harding (1745–1809), English artist and publisher
Silvester Horne (1865–1914), Congregational minister
Sylvester James Jr. (1947–1988), also known as Sylvester, a singer and disco performer
Silvester Johnson (1813–1889), Kentucky merchant and politician
Silvester Knipfer (1939–2010), German sports shooter
Sylvester Levay (born 1954), Hungarian musician
Sylvester McCoy (born 1943), Scottish actor
Silvester Mirabal (1864–1939), American farmer and statesman
Sylvester Mittee (born 1956), Saint Lucian/British boxer of the 1970s and '80s
Silvester Sabolčki (1979–2003), Croatian footballer
Silvester Sedborough (1515/16–1551), member of parliament
Silvester Šereš (1918–2000), Hungarian-Yugoslav footballer
Silvester Shkalla (born 1995), Albanian footballer
Sylvester Stallone (born 1946), American actor
Sylvester Stewart (born 1943), or Sly Stone, musician and record producer, best known as the frontman for Sly and the Family Stone
Silvester Takač (born 1940), Serbian-Yugoslavian footballer and football manager 
Sylvester Terkay (born 1970), American professional wrestler
John Silvester Varley (born 1956), English banker
Silvester van der Water (born 1996), Dutch footballer

Clergy
Antipope Sylvester IV, a claimant from 1105 to 1111
Pope Sylvester I (died 335), Saint Sylvester
Pope Sylvester II (c. 946–1003)
Pope Sylvester III (died 1062 or 1063)
Silvester de Everdon (died 1254), bishop and Lord Chancellor
Sylvester Gozzolini (1177–1267), saint and founder of the Sylvestrines religious order
Silvester Jenks (1656–1714), English priest and theologian
Silvester Petra Sancta (1590–1647), Italian priest and herald
Patriarch Silvester of Alexandria (fl. 1569–1590)
Sylvester of Assisi (died 1240), companion of Saint Francis of Assisi
Sylvester of Antioch, 18th century Greek bishop
Sylvester of Kiev (c. 1055–1123), clergyman and writer in Kievan Rus
Silvester of Troina (died 1185), Basilian monk
Silvester of Valdiseve (1278–1348), monk
Sylvester of Worcester, early 13th century Bishop of Worcester

Surname
Silvester baronets
Andy Silvester (born 1947), British bassist and multi-instrumentalist
Attila Silvester, Greek choreographer
Charles Sylvester, English chemist and inventor
Dean Sylvester, American hockey player
David Silvester (born 1958), Scottish numerical analyst
David Sylvester (medievalist), Canadian medieval historian
Debbie Silvester (born 20th century), British-Australian chemist and professor
Flor Silvester (1923–2008), Dutch graphic designer etc.
Fred Silvester (born 1933), former British politician
Frederick C. Silvester (1901–1966), British organist and composer 
Hannah Sylvester (c. 1900–1973), American blues singer
Harold Sylvester, American film and television actor
James Joseph Sylvester, English mathematician
Jarrod Silvester (born 1965), Australian rules footballer
Jay Silvester (born 1937), American athlete
John Silvester (disambiguation)
Joshua Sylvester, English poet
Marc Sylvester, American middle-distance runner
Michael Silvester (born 1998}, Irish rugby union player
Michael Sylvester (politician), American politician and labor organizer
Michael Sylvester (tenor), American opera-singer
Mike Sylvester, an Italian-American basketball player
Nigel Sylvester, American professional BMX athlete
Paul J. Silvester (born 1963), American white collar criminal
Peter Silvester (disambiguation)
Philip Carteret Silvester (1777–1828), 2nd Baronet
Rick Sylvester, American stuntman
Robin Sylvester, English musician
Sarah Morgan-Silvester (born 1959), Canadian university chancellor
Sherry Sylvester, American political worker and journalist
Stephen Silvester (born 1951), English cricketer
Victor Silvester (1900–1978), English musician and bandleader
Walter Sylvester (1867–1944), English inventor
William Sylvester, American TV and film actor
William Henry Thomas Sylvester, English army officer and surgeon

Fictional characters
Bear Sylvester, a character on the BBC soap opera Doctors
Sylvester, a character in the 1990 American action comedy movie Kindergarten Cop
Sylvester the Cat, a Looney Tunes character
Sylvester Junior, a son of Sylvester J. Pussycat, Sr.
Sylvester, a donkey in the children's book Sylvester and the Magic Pebble
Sylvester, a main character in the series Trapped in the Closet
Sylvester Rax, an antagonist in the 1985 animated show M.A.S.K. (TV series)
Sylvester McMonkey McBean, a character in the Dr. Seuss book The Sneetches and Other Stories
Sue Sylvester, a main character on the Fox sitcom Glee

See also
Saint Sylvester's Day

Masculine given names
Given names derived from plants or flowers
Latin masculine given names
Latin-language surnames
English masculine given names
German masculine given names
Danish masculine given names
Dutch masculine given names

el:Σιλβέστρος
ja:シルヴェスター